Vasudeo Narayan Sarmalkar (unknown – 29 November 1973) also known as Anna Sarmalkar, was an Indian politician from Goa.  He was a former member of the Goa Legislative Assembly representing the Margao Assembly constituency from 1963 to 1972 and Benaulim Assembly constituency from 1972 to 1973. He was a member of the United Goans Party.

Early and personal life
Vasudeo Narayan Sarmalkar hailed from Bardez, Goa. He has a son, Jyoti.

References

1973 deaths
Indian politicians
Goa, Daman and Diu MLAs 1972–1977
United Goans Party politicians
Goa, Daman and Diu MLAs 1967–1972